Harmon is a census-designated place (CDP) and unincorporated community in Morton County, North Dakota, United States near North Dakota Highway 1806. It is ten miles north of Mandan and is within Mandan Public Schools district. The nearby eponymous Harmon Lake Recreation Area also uses a Mandan address.

The town was 'sited' on July 23, 1913, by Willis T. McConnell and named for two bachelor brothers, George and H.H. Harmon. The town went into decline during the Depression in the 1930s and virtually disappeared. The original cemetery is still in use. On January 15, 1951, two Northern Pacific freight trains collided outside of town. The town has repopulated in the 20th century.

Harmon's population was 259 as of the 2020 census, the year in which it became a CDP.

References

Census-designated places in Morton County, North Dakota
Census-designated places in North Dakota
Unincorporated communities in North Dakota
Unincorporated communities in Morton County, North Dakota